This is an inclusive list of the most expensive Indian films, with budgets given in Indian rupees and US dollars.

Most expensive Indian productions (unadjusted for inflation) 
Only productions with a budget of at least ₹100 crore in nominal Indian rupees are listed here. Due to the effects of inflation, all the films on the chart have been produced in the 21st century.

Films

Back-to-back film productions

Historical timeline

Most expensive films by language

Assamese
The Assamese cinema, also known as Jollywood, produces films in Assamese language.

Bengali
The cinema of West Bengal  
produces films in Bengali language.

Bhojpuri
The Bhojpuri cinema, colloquially known as Bhojpuri Chalachitra , produces films in Bhojpuri language.

Gujarati
Gujarati cinema, produces films in Gujarati language.

Hindi
Hindi cinema, also known as Bollywood, produces many of the most expensive Indian films, many of which are released worldwide.

Kannada
The Kannada cinema, also known as Sandalwood, produces films in Kannada language.

Malayalam
The Malayalam cinema, also known as Mollywood, produces films in Malayalam language.

Marathi
The Marathi cinema, produces films in Marathi language.

Meitei 
The Meitei cinema, also known as Manipuri cinema, produces films in Meitei language (officially known as Manipuri language).

Odia
The Odia cinema , produces films in Odia language

Punjabi
The Punjabi cinema, produces films in Punjabi language.

Tamil
The Tamil cinema, colloquially known as Kollywood in reference to its headquarters, Kodambakkam, produces films in Tamil language.

Telugu
The Telugu cinema, also known as Tollywood, produces films in Telugu-language.

See also
 List of most expensive films
 List of most expensive non-English-language films
 List of highest-grossing films
 List of highest-grossing Indian films

Notes

References

Expensive
Indian films